Below is an incomplete list of diplomats from the United Kingdom to Sardinia and its predecessor Savoy, specifically Heads of Missions.

Heads of Missions

Ambassadors to Savoy
1611–1612: Henry Wotton
1614–1615: Sir Albertus Morton
1615–1624: Sir Isaac Wake (Resident Agent) 
1671–1690: Marquis of St Thomas, John Finch and Sir William Soame<ref name="TNA">The National Archives catalogues, class SP 92.  The evidence consists of the names of those corresponding with the British Secretaries of States.</ref>
1691–1693: Edmund Poley 
1693–1694: Dr William Aglionby
1693–1704: The Earl of Galway (absent from 1696)Harman Murtagh, 'Massue de Ruvigny, Henri de, Earl of Galway, and Marquess of Ruvigny in the French nobility (1648–1720)’, Oxford Dictionary of National Biography, Oxford University Press, Sep 2004; online edn, Jan 2008 , accessed 17 April 2009] (Viscount Galway until 1697)
1699 and 1703–1706: Richard Hill
1706: Paul MethuenKarl Wolfgang Schweizer, 'Methuen, Sir Paul (c.1672–1757)’, Oxford Dictionary of National Biography, (Oxford University Press, Sep 2004; online edn, Oct 2008) , accessed 3 November 2008
1706–1713: John Chetwynd, later Viscount Chetwynd.Burke's Peerage (1939), s.v. Chetwynd
1708–1713: Maj. Gen. Francis Palmes
1710–1713: Charles Mordaunt, Earl of Peterbrough Special Mission 1710–1711; Minister Plenipotentiary 1712; Ambassador Extraordinary and Plenipotentiary 1713
1714: George St. John (died 1716 at Venice)
1713–1719: J. Payne, James CockburnIn 1720, Savoy acquired the island of Sardinia, and was subsequently known as the Kingdom of Sardinia.

Envoys Extraordinary and Ministers Plenipotentiary
1719–1725: John Molesworth
1726–1727: John Hedges Envoy Extraordinary1728–1732: Edmund Allen in charge 1727–1728; Secretary 1728–1734
1731–1736: The Earl of Essex Minister Plenipotentiary 1731–1732; Ambassador 1732–1736
1736–1749: Arthur Villettes Resident1747: Lieut-Gen. Thomas Wentworth Special Mission1749–1755: William Nassau de Zuylestein, 4th Earl of Rochford
1755–1758: The Earl of Bristol Envoy Extraordinary1758–1761: James Mackenzie Envoy Extraordinary 1758–1760; then Envoy Extraordinary and PlenipotentiaryHaydn, Joseph - The Book of Dignities (1851), 82.
1761–1768: George Pitt, 1st Baron RiversG. F. R. Barker, 'Pitt, George, first Baron Rivers (1721–1803)’, rev. R. D. E. Eagles, Oxford Dictionary of National Biography, (Oxford University Press, 2004) accessed 24 August 2008.
1768–1779: William Lynch Envoy Extraordinary 1768–1770; then Envoy Extraordinary and Plenipotentiary1779–1783: John Stuart, Viscount Mountstuart
1783–1797: Hon. John Hampden-Trevor Envoy Extraordinary 1783–1789; then Envoy Extraordinary and Plenipotentiary1798–1799: No representation due to the French occupation of Turin1799–1806: Thomas JacksonDiplomatic relations suspended 1806–1808''
1807–1824: Hon. William Hill
1824–1840: Augustus Foster
1840–1851: Hon. Ralph Abercromby
1852–1860: James Hudson

References

Sardinia
United Kingdom to Sardinia